La Cámara de Comercio de las Islas Filipinas,  widely known today as The Chamber of Commerce of the Philippine Islands, 
is the oldest business institution in the Philippines, having been founded in 1886. The Chamber traces its roots back to the Spanish period when the King of Spain, Alfonso XII through Queen Regent Maria Cristina, issued a Royal Decree on April 9, 1886 creating the "Camara" institution for all Spanish colonies.

The Camara de Comercio de Manila was formally organized and presented to its General Assembly on May 24, 1887, and on June 17, 1887 its statutes and by-laws were initially approved by the Gobierno Superior of the Philippines; and finally approved by Her Majesty, the Queen Regent of Spain, Maria Cristina, on February 9, 1888.

Sr. Don Joaquín María Elizalde was its first President, followed in 1890 by Sr. Don Francisco Godínez, and in 1895 by Sr. Don José de Echeita.

After the Spanish–American War in 1888 and the situation settled down, on July 19, 1903, the Camara de Comercio de Manila held its first formal session as the Cámara de Comercio Filipina, with the Philippine Governor-General William Howard Taft as its Honorary President and Don Francisco Reyes as the first Chamber President.

Chamber Presidents 

A chronological listing of the Chamber's presidents and their terms:

The Founders 
Among the founders of the Chamber were representatives of the cross-section of the economy.  They were: Don Juan Rodriguez, shipbuilder; Don Miguel Velasco, real estate owner; Don Rogaciano Rodriguez, businessman; Don Francisco Reyes, banker, who was the first president from 1903-1904; Don Ricardo Aguado, businessman; Don Teodoro Yangco, real estate owner; Don Luis Hidalgo, businessman; Don Pedro A. Roxas, real estate owner and businessman; Don Rafael Reyes, real estate owner and industrialist; Don Tomas Sunico, industrialist; Don Vicente Somosa, real estate owner and businessman; Dr. Ariston Baustista, industrialist; Don Vicente D. Fernandez, attorney-in-fact of Don Pedro P. Roxas; Don Telesforo Chuidian, real estate owner and businessman; Don Bernandino Hernandez, businessman; Don Faustino Lichauco, real estate owner and importer; Don Ramon Soriano, real estate owner and importer; Don Tomas Arguellles, architect; Don Ignacio Syyap, businessman; and Don Rafael del Pan, lawyer.

First Meeting 
The first organizational meeting of the founders was held at the residence of Don Juan Rodriguez on Vives Street in San Nicolas District.  It was presided by Don Miguel Velasco.  In this meeting, the group adopted "Camara de Comercio Filipina" as the name of the organization.  It was later changed in 1919 to "Chamber of Commerce of the Philippine Islands/Camara de Comercio de las Islas Filipinas".

American Period (1903-1946) 

The change of sovereignty in the country from Spanish to American changed the tenor of business in the islands. Vicente Madrigal, Juan B. Alegre, Jose V. Ramirez, Alfonso M. Tiaoqui, Vicente P. Genato, Manuel E. Cuyugan, Vicente T. Fernandez and other prominent members of the Camara proved themselves leaders in espousing improved business relations in the Philippines.

On May 3, 1915, the members of the Camara de Comercio Filipinas amended in Spanish its ESTATUTOS dela Camara de Comercio de las Islas Filipinas, and on June 19, 1915, its ESCRITURA social dela Camara de Comercio de las Islas Filipinas was ratified.

By 1919, English began to be used instead of Spanish, thereby the Camara was also officially referred to in documents as the Chamber of Commerce of the Philippine Islands.  On July 17, 1933, During the 3rd session of the 9th Philippine Legislature, the Secretary of Agriculture and Commerce was authorized to sell to the Chamber a land for its building and approved therein on December 6, 1933. On September 15, 1934, The Chamber was issued title to its own land, and through the contributions of private businesses, The Chamber's 3-storey building, designed by the architect Juan Arellano, was built and inaugurated in 1937 with Philippine President Manuel Quezon officiating with then-President Aurelio Periquet Sr.

After the end of World War II, upon the attainment of Philippine independence, on April 6, 1949, the Securities and Exchange Commission of the Department of Commerce and Industry issued a Reconstruction of Records of the Chamber of some lost documents where the Chamber was named as Cámara de Comercio de las Islas Filipinas (and henceforth, Chamber of Commerce of the Philippine Islands).

Official Publication

The Early COMMERCE Years

Before the Chamber’s founding, the necessity for unilaterally voicing the interests of the business community in the Philippines was a dismissive concept. However, manifold concerns confronting the conduct of business emboldened the Chamber towards issues essential to the material progress of the country.

The Chamber’s official publication, named the “Revista de la Cámara de Comercio de las Islas Filipinas” (and later as “Revista de la Camara de Comercio de las Islas Filipinas”) released its maiden issue in 1927, subsidized by Leopoldo R. Aguinaldo (who became a Chamber president), and who later renamed the magazine’s name to “COMMERCE”. The change in name was made to identify it as the official organ of the Chamber.

COMMERCE Magazine had two sections for English and Spanish readerships, but was later reformatted into a wholly English language publication. It was printed in a deluxe format, on heavy paper, which made it the most expensive, authoritative and exclusive trade publication in the Philippines. In January 1952, Dr. Jose R. Katigbak was appointed to manage the magazine, assisted by M.M. de los Reyes. The Board of Editors headed by Dr. Katigbak included Domingo Abadilla and Hilarion Vibal as staff, followed by other prominent members of the Chamber who took turns in running the publication, such as Teofilo Reyes, Hilarion Vibal, Benito Medina, Carlos de Lara and George Yulo.

The Later COMMERCE Years

The publication of COMMERCE was halted during the Philippine Martial Law regime. In 2015, Jose Luis U. Yulo Jr. (56th President of the Chamber) and Denissa G. Venturanza (Executive Director) decided to revive the publication. Currently, COMMERCE Magazine (Philippines) is issued regularly on a quarterly basis.

Images

References

Chambers of commerce
Chambers of commerce in the Philippines
Trade associations based in the Philippines
1886 establishments in the Philippines
Organizations established in 1886
Organizations based in Manila